is a manga artist who wrote Kobo, the Li'l Rascal, a four-panel comic that has headlined Daily Yomiuri since 1982 and has amassed over 10,000 strips and 60 compilation volumes, as well as inspiring an anime adaptation.

Ueda began drawing comic book strips when he worked in his brother's cram school. Ueda began producing Furiten-kun, a comic book strip about a mahjong player, in 1979. In 1982 Ueda won the Bungeishunjū Manga Award. During that year he began producing Kobo, the Li'l Rascal. In 1988, as part of the United Nations International Literacy Year he visited Nepal as a special commissioner. In 1999 the Japan Comic Artists Association awarded Ueda a prize.

Works

References

External links

 
 Masashi Ueda interview at Manga Time 
 Masahi Ueda article on Kobo-chan 

Manga artists
1947 births
Living people